The first government of Giorgi Gakharia was the government (cabinet) of Georgia, with Giorgi Gakharia as its head as the country's Prime Minister from 8 September 2019 to December 11 2020. The cabinet was formed following the dissolution of the Bakhtadze Government. The ruling Georgian Dream party nominated Interior Minister Giorgi Gakharia  to form a new administration.  His cabinet won the confidence of the Parliament by 98 votes in favor, with no votes cast against it. The first Gakharia Ministry was dissolved following the 2020 parliamentary election.

Ministers

Notes

Government of Georgia (country)
2019 establishments in Georgia (country)
Cabinets established in 2019
2020 disestablishments in Georgia (country)
Cabinets disestablished in 2020